Hof HaCarmel Regional Council (Mo'atza Azorit Hof ha-Karmel, lit. Carmel Coast Regional Council) is a regional council located in the northern Israeli coastal plain. The council serves a large area, stretching from Tirat HaCarmel in the north to Caesarea in the south. Its offices are located in Ein Carmel to the south of Haifa. The head of the council is Asif Izek, elected in 2018.

Location
Straddling the coast of the Mediterranean Sea to the west, the boundaries of the municipal area are:
To the north: Haifa, Tirat HaCarmel and Zevulun Regional Council
To the south: Hadera, Pardes Hanna-Karkur and Menashe Regional Council
To the east: Megiddo and Jezreel Valley regional councils as well as the Wadi Ara settlements.

In the centre of the council area are the enclave towns of Binyamina, Zikhron Ya'akov, Fureidis and Jisr az-Zarqa.

Communities
Hof HaCarmel Regional Council contains many different types of settlements, including eight kibbutzim, ten moshavim and two community settlements. Most of the land in the Hof HaCarmel region is owned and leased by the Israel Land Administration.

Kibbutzim
Beit Oren
Ein Carmel
HaHotrim
Ma'agan Michael
Ma'ayan Tzvi
Nahsholim
Neve Yam
Sdot Yam

Moshavim
Bat Shlomo
Beit Hanania
Dor
Ein Ayala
Geva Carmel
Kerem Maharal
Megadim
Nir Etzion
Ofer
Tzrufa

Community settlements
Atlit
Caesarea

Other villages
Ein Hod
Ein Hawd (Arab village)
Kfar Galim (educational campus)
Kfar Tzvi Sitrin (educational campus)
Meir Shfeya (youth village)
Sheikh Brak (unrecognized and recently abandoned Armenian village)

Education
Educational institutes include:
Yemin Orde (religious)
Zvi Sitrin Village (religious)
Meir Shfeya (youth village)
Hof HaCarmel Comprehensive High School, in Ma'agan Michael
Matal Hof Hacarmel - an educational therapeutic centre established in 1990 by the Board of Education and Hof HaCarmel Regional Council to deal with comprehensive diagnostic and therapy of children with special needs.

Sister regions
 New Hampshire, United States since December 2004

External links

Official website 

 
Regional councils in Israel
Regional councils in Haifa District